Janek Gwizdala (born 19 November 1978) is an English jazz bassist.

Biography
Gwizdala initially preferred drums, but switched to bass guitar after hearing Laurence Cottle. Gwizdala later moved to the U.S. to attend Berklee College of Music.

Recordings as a leader
Mystery to Me, released in 2004, was recorded at Manhattan Center Studios in front of an audience in one take.

Live at the 55bar was recorded live over two nights in November 2007 and released on 7 February 2008.

Discography

As leader 
 Mystery to Me - 2004
 Live at the 55bar - 2008
 The Space in Between - 2010
 It Only Happens Once - 2012
 Theatre by the Sea - 2013
 Motion Picture - 2014
 American Elm - 2016
 Bass Duo - 2017
 The Union - 2019

As sideman
 Yazz Ahmed, Finding My Way Home (Suntara, 2011)
 Peter Erskine, Dr. Um (Fuzzy Music, 2016)
 Ronny Jordan, At Last (N-Coded, 2003)
 Bob Reynolds, Runway (2020)
 Kazumi Watanabe, Tricoroll (EWE, 2011)
 Kazumi Watanabe, Live at Iridium (EWE, 2012)

References

External links
 Official Website
 [ Discography at Allmusic]

1978 births
Living people
21st-century bass guitarists
21st-century British male musicians
Berklee College of Music alumni
British bass guitarists
British emigrants to the United States
British record producers
Male bass guitarists